Three Crooked Men is a 1958 British crime film directed by Ernest Morris and starring Gordon Jackson.

Plot 
Three crooks break into a store hoping to gain access to the bank next door. The store keeper has remained in the rear of the store after a drunken fight with his wife, the men take him hostage. A passerby, a bank employee, hears him shout knocks on the front door, tries to help, but he too is captured. The two kidnapped men are dumped in the country eventually getting free and are recognized/arrested as the "wanted men" in news reports.  Under questioning the police don't want to believe them as the missing shop owner and missing bank employee seem to have committed the crime.  While awaiting court the two men return to the store come across a photo which had been dropped during the break-in and decide their best chance is to track down the thieves themselves.

Cast 
 Gordon Jackson as Don Wescot
 Sarah Lawson as May Wescot
 Eric Pohlmann as Masters 
 Philip Saville as Seppy
 Warren Mitchell as Walter Prinn
 Michael Goodliffe as Shop Customer
 Michael Mellinger as Vince 
 Kenneth Edwards as Inspector Wheeler
 Frank Sieman as Constable Jason
 Peter Bathurst as Mr Bond
 Arnold Bell as Mr Brady, the Bank Manager
 Michael Allinson as Photographer's Assistant
 Len Sharp as Joe, Proprietor of Café

References

External links
 
 

1958 films
British crime films
Films shot at New Elstree Studios
1950s English-language films
Films directed by Ernest Morris
1950s British films